Rod Griffiths (born 20 April 1948) is a New Zealand cricketer. He played in seven first-class matches for Northern Districts from 1975 to 1981.

See also
 List of Northern Districts representative cricketers

References

External links
 

1948 births
Living people
New Zealand cricketers
Northern Districts cricketers
Cricketers from Blenheim, New Zealand